The 2006 Hungarian Grand Prix (officially the Formula 1 Magyar Nagydíj 2006) was a Formula One motor race held on 6 August 2006 at the Hungaroring, Mogyoród, Pest, Hungary. It was the 13th race of the 2006 Formula One season. Jenson Button won the race driving a Honda, the first victory of his career, the first race win for a British driver since David Coulthard won the Australian Grand Prix three years previously, and the first by an Englishman since Johnny Herbert won the 1999 European Grand Prix nearly seven years previously, in similarly changeable weather circumstances. Pedro de la Rosa finished second for McLaren-Mercedes, the only podium finish of his career, and Nick Heidfeld finished third, giving BMW Sauber their first podium.

It was the first win for Honda as a constructor since John Surtees' victory in the 1967 Italian Grand Prix 39 years prior, the first win for a Honda engine since Gerhard Berger's full-works Honda-powered McLaren triumphed in the 1992 Australian Grand Prix, 14 years and 231 races earlier and the first win for a non-European constructor since Jody Scheckter won with Canadian team Wolf in the 1977 Canadian Grand Prix. The race would also prove to be Honda's only win in their second stint in Formula One as a full constructor, ending in late 2008 after Honda decided to pull out of F1 after the Global Financial Crisis.

It was the last victory for a Honda engine in Formula One until Max Verstappen won the 2019 Austrian Grand Prix for Red Bull. It was also the last victory for Honda as a full constructor entry in Formula One to date. It was also the last all-Michelin podium to date.

Report

Friday drivers
The bottom 6 teams in the 2005 Constructors' Championship and Super Aguri were entitled to run a third car in free practice on Friday. These drivers drove on Friday but did not compete in qualifying or the race. Fabrizio del Monte was originally announced as Midland's third driver.

Practice 
During Friday practice Fernando Alonso was given a two-second qualifying penalty by the stewards for dangerous driving and overtaking under a yellow flag condition. This meant that two seconds would be added to his times in each part of qualifying. Christijan Albers was given a ten-place grid penalty for an engine change, his second in as many weekends. Jenson Button received the same penalty after having an engine change when his let go in the final practice session.

In a similar situation to Alonso's penalty, Michael Schumacher was given a two-second penalty for overtaking Robert Kubica and Alonso under "red flag" conditions at the end of Saturday's last free practice session. The decision left Schumacher "fuming," with him saying "I blame myself partly for what did happen, but I didn't expect this kind of penalty."

Qualifying
In qualifying, Kimi Räikkönen achieved pole position with a time of 1:19.599 seconds. Felipe Massa qualified second, with Rubens Barrichello starting the race in third.

Race

The track was wet at the start of the race, making it the first wet Hungarian Grand Prix. All drivers started the race on intermediate tyres with the exception of Barrichello, who was on wets. Polesitter Kimi Räikkönen took the lead early on. Alonso and Schumacher made their way through the field with Schumacher up into 6th place from 11th into the first corner, and Alonso climbing from 15th place with a spectacular first hard-fought lap. He went on to pass Schumacher on the outside of turn 5 after a straight fight for several laps and reached 3rd place. He then took the lead after the McLarens of Pedro de la Rosa and Räikkönen pitted. Bridgestone wet-tyres used to dictate the field in non-dry conditions but today it seemed a one-off for the Japanese rubber. All Bridgestone-drivers, including the Ferraris, were seen struggling and seriously down on pace compared to their competitors. Schumacher fell right back in the clutches of Giancarlo Fisichella and lost his front wing battling for 5th place, hitting the Italian mid-corner fighting off snap-oversteer. This forced the German to pit, going a lap down. Soon after Jenson Button overtook Massa, Fisichella and Schumacher in just under the space of 2 laps. Räikkönen struggled on his second set of tyres and ended up crashing into the back of Vitantonio Liuzzi's Toro Rosso, vaulting the car and bringing out the safety car. Alonso then pitted, allowing Schumacher to get back on the lead lap. Another beneficiary of the safety car was Jenson Button, who decided not to pit during the safety car period and climbed up to 2nd place behind Alonso. After the period was over Button began to challenge Alonso, but soon had to pit for fuel. Alonso led, but after a pitstop for dry tyres his right-rear wheel nut detached, causing the Spaniard to lose control and crash. Button inherited the lead and was never challenged from then on. Schumacher made his way up to 2nd by staying on intermediate tyres as others around him pitted for dry weather ones, but this gamble backfired as the cars on drys caught him in the final laps. Schumacher defended his position, including controversially cutting a chicane on consecutive laps without penalty, but Pedro de la Rosa and Nick Heidfeld both ultimately passed him. Whilst he was being overtaken Schumacher banged wheels with Heidfeld, damaging his Ferrari's suspension and forcing him out of the race three laps short of the finish.

Button won the race despite beginning in 14th place through relentless driving with de la Rosa scoring his first podium with second place, and Heidfeld getting BMW Sauber's first podium with 3rd. Debutant driver Robert Kubica finished in seventh place and would have scored two points, but was later disqualified as his car was found to be underweight due to excessive tyre wear. This coincidentally meant that Michael Schumacher earned a point despite not finishing, as he was elevated to 8th place in the final results.

Classification

Qualifying

Notes
  – Jenson Button and Christijan Albers both received a ten-place grid penalty because of earlier engine changes.
  – The Grand Prix stewards declared that Scott Speed had impeded another driver during the qualifying session, and penalised him by deleting his three fastest qualifying times. His qualifying time became 1:23.005 instead of 1:22.317, setting him one position back on the grid.
  – Fernando Alonso and Michael Schumacher both had two seconds added to their lap times for each part of qualifying; the times shown here include the two-second penalties.

Race

Notes
  – Kubica originally finished seventh, but was disqualified after the race, as his car was 2 kg underweight at the end of the race due to excessive tyre wear.

Championship standings after the race

Drivers' Championship standings

Constructors' Championship standings

 Note: Only the top five positions are included for both sets of standings.
 Bold text indicates competitors who still had a theoretical chance of becoming World Champion.

Awards
ITV's coverage of this race won a BAFTA in 2007, in the category "Best Sport".
The awards took place May 20, 2007.

See also 
 2006 Hungaroring GP2 Series round

References

External links

Race report at the BBC

Hungarian Grand Prix
Hungarian Grand Prix
Grand Prix
Hungarian